Stacey Chanelle Clare Solomon-Swash (born 4 October 1989) is an English singer and television personality. She finished in third place on the sixth series of The X Factor in 2009, and won the tenth series of I'm a Celebrity... Get Me Out of Here! in 2010. Her debut single, a cover of "Driving Home for Christmas", was released in 2011, followed by her debut studio album, Shy, in 2015. In 2016, Solomon presented I'm a Celebrity: Extra Camp, and began appearing as a panellist on the ITV talk show Loose Women.

Early life
Stacey Chanelle Clare Solomon was born in Dagenham, London, on 4 October 1989, the daughter of Fiona, a nurse and David Neal Solomon, a photographer. Her mother was born into an Anglican family and was the daughter of a vicar, but converted to Judaism before marrying Solomon's father, who is of Iraqi-Jewish and Polish-Jewish descent. Her parents divorced when she was nine. She has said of her Jewish background, "Growing up, the influence Judaism had on me was an overwhelming understanding to love those around you, care for others as if they are part of your family and strive to be the best individual you can be." She attended a Christian primary school, where she said she "felt included and no different to [her] peers", but later studied at the Jewish King Solomon High School in Barkingside.

Career

Music 
In 2009, Solomon auditioned for the sixth series of The X Factor, performing "What a Wonderful World". Solomon was among the top 12 contestants and advanced to the live shows and was mentored by Dannii Minogue. During the first week of the live shows she performed Coldplay's "The Scientist", which gained positive reviews from the judges. During week two, she performed "At Last", receiving the most public votes. She sang "When You Wish Upon a Star" during the third week. On the fourth week, all contestants had to sing rock songs; Minogue selected "Somewhere Only We Know", and Solomon's performance resulted in positive reviews. On the fifth week, she sang "Son of a Preacher Man". The sixth week into the competition, Solomon sang Queen's "Who Wants to Live Forever".

During the sixth week, she also released a cover of Michael Jackson's "You Are Not Alone", which topped the charts on the UK Singles Chart and the Irish Singles Chart On the seventh week, she performed "I Can't Make You Love Me" and again received positive reviews from the judges and the audience. In the quarter-final, Solomon performed "Rule the World" by Take That and "Something About the Way You Look Tonight" by Elton John. In the semi-final she performed another Michael Jackson song, "The Way You Make Me Feel", and the song "Somewhere" for which she received a standing ovation again by the judges. During the final week, Solomon performed a duet "Feeling Good" with Michael Bublé. She also performed "What a Wonderful World" and "Who Wants to Live Forever". Solomon was awarded third place in the competition, behind Joe McElderry and Olly Murs.

Solomon went on tour with her fellow X Factor finalists. In December 2010, she returned to the show, where she presented the show from Essex for winner, Matt Cardle.

In June 2011, Solomon began working on her debut album, due to be released in 2012. Her first single from the album was originally to be released in February, but was delayed. On 5 November 2011, Solomon performed to thousands as the headline act at Paisley's Christmas Lights Switch On event. In September 2011, it was reported that Solomon was in a bidding war between record labels. However, she stated that she will have complete control. She was also asked to join The Only Way Is Essex, but turned it down.

On 18 December 2011, Solomon released a cover of Chris Rea's "Driving Home for Christmas" as her Christmas single. The single was used for the Iceland Christmas commercial and reached number 27 in the UK Singles Chart.

On 29 November 2013, Solomon was announced as the headline artist to lead a choir of over 110,000 primary school children. She joined the Young Voices tour, which took place from 14 January to 5 February 2014 in Birmingham, Sheffield, London and Manchester. The singer performed tracks from her forthcoming debut album on the tour, scheduled for release in 2014. Her debut album "Shy" was released in April 2015 along with the title track "Shy". In 2016, she released her second single from the album, "My Big Mistake".

Solomon returned to the fourteenth series of The X Factor UK on Saturday 2 December 2017 and Sunday 3 December 2017, co-presenting alongside George Shelley. She interviewed the fourteenth series' finalists parents, families, relatives and friends at the live finals from ExCeL London on things such as how they feel about their finalist and wishing their finalist good luck. The interview is to give the audience a sense of support the finalists have behind them. Solomon and Shelley were co-presenters for this purpose of interviewing only, the main presenter being Dermot O'Leary. She returned in the same position the following year.

Solomon has had fashion collaborations with Irish fast fashion brand Primark, including a children's range which she marketed with her own children. She paired up with Amazon in 2020.

Television
Solomon took part in the tenth series of the reality show I'm a Celebrity...Get Me Out of Here! She beat Shaun Ryder in the final and was crowned "Queen of the Jungle".

In 2011, she became the face of supermarket Iceland, taking over from Coleen Nolan.

Solomon performed a duet with Ryder at the 16th National Television Awards – "Feeling Good" and "Step On" by Happy Mondays.

In October 2010, she won the Living TV show Party Wars. In April 2011, Solomon and Keith Lemon presented Sing If You Can. On 5 September 2011, Solomon appeared in the Sooty episode "The Wedding" as Miss Solomon the Vicar.

From 11 March 2012, Solomon and Chris Moyles presented Sky Living's dating show The Love Machine . In Spring 2012, Solomon starred in an episode of Mad Mad World on ITV with Eamonn Holmes and Stephen K. Amos. From 5 September 2012, Solomon was part of the judging panel for ITV2's Top Dog Model.

In May 2014, Solomon recorded the theme tune for Channel 5's children's show Pip Ahoy!. She also has a recurring role in the show, voicing Fuchsia the Flamingo.

From February 2015, Solomon took part in the second series of The Jump and was eliminated on 4 February.

Throughout Summer 2016, Solomon appeared several times as a guest panellist on ITV daytime show Loose Women. It was later announced she would become a regular panellist alongside Lisa Riley after Vicky Pattison and Jamelia left the show.

On 22 September 2016, it was announced Solomon would take over from Laura Whitmore and become co-host of newly named I'm a Celebrity...Get Me Out of Here! spin-off I'm a Celebrity...Get Me Out of Here! Extra Camp alongside Vicky Pattison, Joe Swash and Chris Ramsey. She didn't return for the following series.

On a celebrity special of The Chase aired on 30 October 2016, Solomon won £60,000 in her individual chase, opposing Anne Hegerty (The Governess).

On 25 June 2017, Solomon appeared as a guest on ITV2's Love Island: Aftersun, a chat-show companion to Love Island. She also took part in a celebrity edition of The Crystal Maze on Channel 4.

In January 2018 she participated in And They're Off! in aid of Sport Relief. Stacey also launched a clothing range with Primark on 11 October 2018.

In February 2019 on an episode of Loose Women, Solomon announced she would become a regular panellist for ITV2's Celebrity Juice, hosted by Keith Lemon.

On 10 March 2021, Solomon announced on Instagram the BBC had commissioned home-decluttering series Sort Your Life Out, with her presenting. A second series of the programme started on 25 January 2023.

On 15 December 2022, Solomon presented the festive craft show Stacey Solomon's Crafty Christmas.

Fashion line

Clothing range - Stacey X Primark

On 11 October 2018, Solomon launched her own fashion line in  Primark, the range consisted of a variety of women's clothing and accessories with sizes range from 2XS to 2XL.

In October 2019, a second collection was released, an Autumn/Winter collection of women's clothing.

In 2020, saw Stacey collaborate with Primark yet again however this time with her first kids collection. This launch consisted of a variety of kids clothes range. 2021 saw a new kids range released including sleepwear, loungewear and autumn/winter children's clothes. Additional collaborations with primark include Stacy Home which sees some of her slogans used on kitchenware.

Launched at the end of May, Stacey's latest collaboration with Primark is a Spring/summer kids collection as well as some matching adult pieces. Items in the range include towel cover ups, swimwear, dresses, shorts and even some picnic essentials such as wooden plates, non slip bowls, silicone bibs etc.

Clothing range - Stacey X In the Style

In April 2021, it was announced Solomon would be collaborating on a clothing range with In the Style. This summer collection included a variety of women's dresses, slogan tees, jumpsuit and more.

Her latest collections, launched in 2022 include a spring/summer collection in April and then most recently an occasion wear collection in July 2022.

Personal life
Solomon had her first child in 2008 at age 18, with her then-boyfriend Dean Cox. Her second son, born in 2012, was fathered by her ex-fiancé Aaron Barnham.

Solomon began dating television personality Joe Swash in 2016 after they met during the tenth series of I'm a Celebrity... Get Me Out of Here! in 2010. They have a son together, born in May 2019.   On 4 October 2021, her 32nd birthday, she announced that she had given birth to a daughter that same day. 

She announced her engagement to Swash on her Instagram page on 24 December 2020. Solomon and Swash were married at their home on 24 July 2022. She is also the stepmother of Swash's son from a previous relationship.

On 28 December 2022, Solomon announced she was 8 months pregnant with her fifth child and third with Swash. In February 2023, she gave birth to their daughter, Belle.

Solomon has been open about dealing with anxiety.

Discography

Albums

Singles

As lead artist

As featured artist

See also
 List of I'm a Celebrity...Get Me Out of Here! (British TV series) contestants
 List of The X Factor (British TV series) finalists

References

External links

 Official website

1989 births
Living people
English people of Polish-Jewish descent
English people of Iraqi-Jewish descent
English women pop singers
People from Dagenham
Sony BMG artists
The X Factor (British TV series) contestants
I'm a Celebrity...Get Me Out of Here! (British TV series) winners
English Jews